The Wales national football team represents Wales in international association football and is governed by the Football Association of Wales (FAW). Between 1960 and 1979 the side played 118 matches, the majority of which came against the other national teams of the Home Nations in the British Home Championship. Their first match of the period was a 3–2 victory over Northern Ireland which secured a shared Home Championship title as Wales, England and Scotland each finished with four points.

Having reached the quarter-finals of the 1958 FIFA World Cup, Wales suffered defeat in the qualifying stages for the 1962 tournament. As the team also failed to qualify for the 1966 FIFA World Cup they instead undertook tours to South America in both summers, playing several matches against Brazil and other sides. Wales also entered the 1964 European Nations' Cup, after not taking part in the inaugural competition four years earlier, but were eliminated in the first qualifying round by Hungary. The decade ended at a low point as Wales failed to gain a single point in qualifying for the 1970 FIFA World Cup and finished bottom of the last British Home Championship of the decade.

Wales reached the quarter-finals of the 1976 European Championships, but suffered defeat in a two-legged tie against Yugoslavia. The second leg at Ninian Park proved controversial over refereeing decisions while crowd trouble led Wales to receive sanctions on home venues from FIFA. In 1978, Wales recorded the second biggest margin of victory in their history by defeating Malta 7–0, with Ian Edwards scoring four times on his debut.

Of the 118 matches, Wales played during this period, they won 32. They were most successful against Northern Ireland, winning 10 of 20 meetings between the two sides. They also defeated Scotland three times and recorded two victories over four other sides. Wales were least successful against England, winning only once in 22 meetings and losing 14.

Results
Wales' score is shown first in each case. The colours listed below are also used to signify results combined with the scoreline.

Head to head records

Notes

References 
Statistics 
 
 

Bibliography

Footnotes

 

1960s in Wales
1970s in Wales
1960-1979
1959–60 in Welsh football
1960–61 in Welsh football
1961–62 in Welsh football
1962–63 in Welsh football
1963–64 in Welsh football
1964–65 in Welsh football
1965–66 in Welsh football
1966–67 in Welsh football
1967–68 in Welsh football
1968–69 in Welsh football
1969–70 in Welsh football
1970–71 in Welsh football
1971–72 in Welsh football
1972–73 in Welsh football
1973–74 in Welsh football
1974–75 in Welsh football
1975–76 in Welsh football
1976–77 in Welsh football
1977–78 in Welsh football
1978–79 in Welsh football
1979–80 in Welsh football